Robin's Nest may refer to:

Robin's Nest (Hong Kong), a hill and country park in northeastern New Territories of Hong Kong
Robin's Nest (TV series), a British sitcom made by Thames Television
Robin's Nest (estate), the fictional Hawaiian estate in Magnum P.I.